Justitia is a genus of spiny lobsters. Following the recognition of Nupalirus as a separate genus, Justitia comprises one extant species and two fossil species:
Justitia longimanus (H. Milne-Edwards, 1837) – Recent
Justitia longimanus longimanus (H. Milne-Edwards, 1837) – western Atlantic
Justitia longimana mauritiana (Miers, 1882) – Indo-Pacific
† Justitia desmaresti (Massalongo, 1854) – late Ypresian or early Lutetian, Monte Bolca, Italy 
† Justitia vicetina Beschin et al., 2001 – middle Lutetian, Chiampo, Vicenza, Italy

References

Achelata
Decapod genera
Extant Lutetian first appearances
Lutetian genus first appearances
Taxa named by Lipke Holthuis